Shamsabad (also Romanized as Shamsābād; also known as Shamsābād-e ‘Aqdā) is a village in Aqda Rural District, Aqda District, Ardakan County, Yazd Province, Iran. At the 2006 census, its population was 237, in 71 families.

References 

Populated places in Ardakan County